Coleophora bipunctella is a moth of the family Coleophoridae. It is found in Texas, United States.

The wingspan is about 10 mm.

References

bipunctella
Moths described in 1882
Moths of North America